Ramanuj Sharma, popularly known as Anuj Sharma, is an Indian film, stage and television personality in Chhattisgarhi cinema He is known for his talents in directing, acting, singing and stage shows. He was honoured by the Government of India, in 2014, by having bestowed upon him the Padma Shri, the fourth highest civilian award, for his services to the field of arts. Ramanuj Sharma is the first film personality from Chhattisgarh to receive the Padma Shri award.

Biography

Ramanuj Sharma  was born on 15 May 1976, to Teken Lal Sharma and Dehuti Sharma, at Bhatapara in Raipur in the central Indian state of Chhattisgarh. He did his schooling at a local school in Bhatapara and, later, secured a Master's degree in History from the Pandit Ravishankar Shukla University, Raipur.

Anuj Sharma is married to Smita Sharma and lives with the couple and their children in Labhandi, Raipur. Earlier he lived in Sant Kabir Nagar, Raipur.

Career
Anuj Sharma started acting and singing at the age of ten. After a brief stint as the marketing executive at Godrej, Sharma made his debut in the 2000 film, Mor Chhaihan Bhuiyan, considered to be the first of the modern era of Chhattisgarhi film history, which was till then at a nascent stage; the first of the Chhattisgarhi films was made only in 1965 and the second one in 1971. The film became a commercial success, running for 27 consecutive weeks at one cinema, eclipsing the then record for consecutive shows. The film was screened at two cinemas for a week at eight shows a day, a record reported to be standing till now.

The success of the debut film elevated Anuj to stardom which saw him making eight releases a year and 4 silver jubilee hits, the only lead actor to do so in Chhattisgarhi films. The career, which featured successful movies like Maya, Mister Tetkuram and Mahu Diwana Tahu Diwani, also saw him getting the best actor award four times. The prolificacy of his acting career also returned two of his films being released on the same day. Sharma's films have been dubbed into many other languages such as Sambalpuri, Jharkhandi, Bundelkhandi, Gujarati, and Bhojpuri. He has also acted in a number of Bhojpuri films.

Anuj Sharma has active presence on stage and television, with more than 300 stage shows in various parts of central India. He is also associated with UNICEF for the campaigns in Chhattisgarh. He has also performed as radio jockey in the National FM channel and was the first Chhattisgarhi compere. He has compered around 125 television shows so far. He has also made advertisement and promotion films for the Chhattisgarh Tourism Board and for other commercial institutions as well.

A Chhattisgarhi folk singer by practice, Sharma is reported to be at ease singing all styles of Chhattisgarhi folk songs. He has over 100 video albums, has sung over 200 film and folk songs, and has composed music for 10 audio albums. He also owns a music label called "Aaarug Music"

Filmography 

 All films are in Chhattisgarhi language unless otherwise noted.

Discography 

 All songs are in Chhattisgarhi language unless otherwise noted.

Awards and recognitions 
Anuj (Ramanuj) Sharma was honoured by the Government of India by awarding him the Padma Shri, in 2014, in recognition of his efforts to the cause of art. Anuj Sharma has also received many other awards such as:

Film awards

Other awards
 Chhattisgarh Ratna Samman - Pandit Ravishankar Shukla University, Raipur - 2013
 Pratibha Samman - Chhattisgarh B. S. Central Committee - 2011
 Vipra Samman - Sarv Brahman Samaj - 2011
 Toy Award - JCI Raipur Metro - 2011
 Young Communicator Award - International School of Business and Media - 2010
 Young Communicator Award - Symmbiosis Institute of Media and Communication - 2009
 Honour - Tamil Nadu Hindi Sahitya Academy

Anuj Sharma was listed by the Times of India among the Kings of the Provinces when they published a special report in connection with the 100 years of Indian Cinema celebrations, placing him among the stalwarts of Indian cinema such as M. G. Ramachandran, N. T. Rama Rao and Mohanlal.

See also

References

External links
 
 
 
 

1976 births
Living people
Recipients of the Padma Shri in arts
Indian male film actors
Indian male singers
Singers from Chhattisgarh
Musicians from Chhattisgarh
Chhattisgarhi-language singers
People from Raipur, Chhattisgarh
People from Chhattisgarh
Indian male television actors
Male actors from Chhattisgarh
Actors from Chhattisgarh